The Tennessee Lottery 250 is a NASCAR Xfinity Series at Nashville Superspeedway. Traditionally held on Holy Saturday from 2001 to 2011, the race was removed when Dover Motorsports ceased operations of this track and Gateway International Raceway. It was reinstated in 2021 when Dover Motorsports took the second date away from Dover International Speedway and realigned it to reopening the Nashville Superspeedway, with the date moved to the Cup weekend in June.

Past winners

2021: Race extended due to NASCAR Overtime.

Multiple winners (drivers)

Multiple winners (teams)

Manufacturer wins

See also
Federated Auto Parts 300 – Former Xfinity race at the track, held from 2002 to 2011
Rackley Roofing 200 – Current Truck Series race at the track

References

External links

NASCAR Xfinity Series races
 
Recurring sporting events established in 2001
Annual sporting events in the United States
2001 establishments in Tennessee